is a Japanese manga series by Kazuya Minekura which was serialized in G-Fantasy from 1997 to 2002. It spawned multiple manga sequels, several anime adaptations, live-action musicals, video games and other media. The Saiyuki franchise has become a mainstay of manga/anime culture, and its various entries have continually garnered critical praise and accolades.The story is loosely based on the 16th century Chinese novel Journey to the West.

As of January 2021, The manga franchise as a whole has 25 million copies in circulation worldwide, making it one of the best-selling manga series.

Plot

In a twist on the classic Chinese tale Journey to the West, It was a time of chaos, when Heaven and Earth were as one, and humans and demons - the youkai - lived together in peace. The foundations of civilization and religion were raised and reinforced in this land of Togenkyo, the paradise known as Shangri-la. But now, a great evil threatens harmony in this great land. Far to the West, in India, someone is attempting to resurrect the youkai lord Gyumaoh by mixing human science with youkai magic. This forbidden practice has created a Minus Wave of negative energy that is spreading across Shangri-la, poisoning the souls of the youkai and turning them into mindless monsters. The only hope lies in four legendary heroes: Genjo Sanzo, a high priest with low morals. Son Goku, the hungry and mischievous Monkey King, just released from 500 years imprisonment. Sha Gojyo, a water sprite with an addiction for good smokes and bad women. Cho Hakkai (formerly known as Cho Gonou), the legendary demon slayer, and his transforming dragon Hakuryu. To save Shangri-la, these unlikely companions, united by fate, must travel together ... INTO THE WEST!

Media

Manga

The Saiyuki manga comprises five separate series. The original series comprised nine volumes, and was serialized in the manga magazine Monthly G-Fantasy from 1997 to 2002. Ichijinsha reprinted all nine volume from October 26, 2002, to June 25, 2003. Also a new edition of all nine Volumes of "Saiyuki" has been published by Ichijinsha in 2015. 
 The series follows Genjo Sanzo, is a Buddhist priest in the city of Shangri-La, which is being ravaged by yokai spirits that have fallen out of balance with the natural order. His superiors send him on a journey far to the west to discover why this is happening and how to stop it. His companions are three yokai with human souls. But this is no day trip—the four will encounter many discoveries and horrors on the way, and on the road.

The first English License was Tokyopop published all nine volumes of the manga from 2004 to 2005. beginning in 2020 Kodansha Comics is re-releasing Minekura's Saiyuki manga in 400-page hardcover volumes with new translations. The company released the second volume phsyically and digitally on August 18. Also Madman Entertainment releases Saiyuki (Manga) The Original Series - Resurrected Edition on March 13, 2020. The manga releases in North American From February 20, 2020, to January 23, 2021.

The second series began in June 1999, and was called Saiyuki Gaiden. Saiyuki Gaiden comprised four volumes and ran for ten years. 
The manga have been serialized in Enix's Monthly GFantasy from 1999 to 2002, and Ichijinsha's Comic Zero Sum WARD Resume the series since 2003. 
The first volume released by Enix On December 1, 2000. The manga on hold for one year in 2004.

The new edition of first volume released by the Ichijinsha On December 28, 2005. Gaiden work, It is a story of an era that dates back 500 years from the main story, and  three volumes have been published On May 16, 2009. The final volume, Volume four had been released on July 25, 2009. A Special edition named "Saiyuki Gaiden memorial"was also released On July 16, 2009. In September, 2012, new series "Tenjou no Ari" from "Saiyuki Gaiden" will be released as a one-shot. "Saiyuki Gaiden Heavenly Ants" is the story of the first platoon of the heavenly western army led by Tenpo.

In 2009 Saiyuki Gaiden Manga gets OVA green-Lit, A Three episodes OVA Licensors from Sentai Filmworks and Aired by Studios Anpro in Mar 25, 2011 to Nov 25, 2011 and The May issue of Ichijinsha's Monthly Comic Zero Sum magazine is announcing that a special edition release of the Saiyuki Gaiden original video anime OVA name Saiyuki Gaiden: Tokubetsu-hen - Kouga no Shou Aired in Apr 26, 2013, All 4 volumes of OVA "Saiyuki Gaiden" are finally converted to Blu-ray BOX by completely new HD digital remastering,
Full of luxurious benefits such as the original sleeve box drawn by Kazuya Minekura and his acrylic stand. 
In January 2013 Anime Saiyuki Gaiden DVD Complete Collection Releases in North American.

In 2002, a third series was made entitled Saiyuki Reload that lasted 10 volumes long. The third series was serialized in the monthly Japanese Josei manga magazine Monthly Comic Zero Sum and completed its run in 2009 in the August edition.
On September 27, 2010, Ichijinsha's Monthly Comic Zero Sum magazine has announced on Tuesday that Saiyuki (manga) creator Kazuya Minekura is putting her manga serial work on indefinite hiatus due to her poor health, She explained that she is undergoing one medical check after another for a possible surgery, so she cannot maintain her work schedule, Until her hiatus. 
Tokyopop has published the original Saiyuki manga and Saiyuki Reload in North America, and ADV Films and Geneon Entertainment (USA) have released their various television and film anime adaptations. 

The third series spun out a fourth series called Saiyuki Reload Blast
The serialization started from the February 2010 issue of the monthly comic ZERO-SUM (Ichijinsha), and is currently serialized every other month in the same magazine. After a year and a half of Minekura's writing break, "Saiyuki RELOAD BLAST" serialization resumed from March. Volume One was released On July 25, 2012. On June 25, also a limited edition with a mini art book of Volume One has been released.

On July 27, 2013, Saiyuki Reload Blast Manga Slow Down Due to Creator's Health. Ichijinsha published the manga's second compiled book volume in 2014. In April 2016 Saiyuki Reload Blast Manga Goes on Hiatus Because Kazuya Minekura, the manga's author, is suffering from poor health, and put the manga on hiatus. On July 13, 2017, revealed that The third compiled volume of Kazuya Minekura's Saiyuki Reload Blast manga is slated to ship on August 31. It will be the first compiled volume for the series since the second volume shipped in July 2014. A special edition with an all-color illustration and sketch booklet has been also released. The Series went on hiatus in October 2017 and Resumes After 18-Month Hiatus.

The fifth and final series made titled Saiyuki Ibun started in 2009, and is currently running in Zero Sum Ward, Saiyuki Ibun recounts how a man grew up to become the pivotal character Kōmyō, years before the first Saiyuki storyline. The fifth series follows Priest Koumyou Sanzo in his days before inheriting the Sanzo Title.

On 2012 Kazuya Minekura resumed her Saiyuki Ibun manga in the 30th issue of Ichijinsha's Zero-Sum Ward magazine on Friday After 28-Month Hiatus. The last chapter of the manga before the hiatus was published in Zero-Sum Ward's 16th issue in July 2010 — two years and four months ago.
Minekura had put her manga series work on hiatus in 2010 due to surgery for ameloblastoma, a noncancerous tumor on her right upper jawbone. In addition to Saiyuki Ibun. In February 2013 in The 32nd issue of Monthly Comic Zero Sum magazine revealed on Saturday that Kazuya Minekura's Saiyuki Ibun manga is going on indefinite hiatus.

In January 2021, Ritsuhiro Mikami Draws Spinoff One-Shot for Kazuya Minekura's Saiyuki Manga, The manga will appear in a special supplement in the magazine dedicated to Minekura's Saiyuki Reload Blast manga. Minekura's Saiyuki Reload manga is inspiring a new television anime titled Saiyuki Reload: Zeroin, which will cover the manga's "Even a Worm" arc.

On October 27, 2022 announced that Saiyuki Manga Makes the Journey to Three Cities for 25th Anniversary Exhibition, The exhibition begins its long journey first in Osaka at Namba Marui from December 30, 2022 to January 15, 2023, followed by Yurakucho Marui in Tokyo from May 12 to May 28 and Hakata Marui in Fukuoka from August 11 to September 3. Additional events in other regions are also planned.

Anime

There are currently five series in the animation version: including three TV animation series, produced by Studio Pierrot, with 50 episodes of "Fantasy and Magic Legend", 25 episodes of "Most Travels Reload", and 26 episodes of "Most Travels Reload Gunlock", in TV Tokyo broadcast. several OVA series, "Most Travels" 2 episodes, "Most Travels Burial -burial-" 3 episodes and "Most Travels Biography" 3 episodes. In addition, there is a set of theatrical version of "Theatrical version of Fantasy and Magic, the most travel notes Requiem's Requiem for the losers".

The first adaptation of Saiyuki was a two episode OVA by Tokyo Kids. The first episode was released on April 23, 1999, while the second episode was released on August 27, 1999. A television series was created by Studio Pierrot titled Gensomaden Saiyuki. The series aired on TV Tokyo from April 4, 2000, to March 27, 2001, on Tuesdays at 18:30, spanning 50 episodes. Enoki Films holds the US license to Gensomaden Saiyuki under the title Saiyuki: Paradise Raiders.

the first animated film title Saiyuki: Requiem produced by Pierrot,  directed by Hayato Date and written by Katsuyuki Sumisawa and was first released in Japanese theaters on August 18, 2001. Saiyuki: Requiem adapted into English licensed by ADV.

Another series, Saiyuki ReLoad was created by the same companies and it adapts from the manga of the same name. It aired on the same network from October 2, 2003, to March 25, 2004, on Thursdays at 18:30. A sequel titled Saiyuki Reload GunLock was also created by the companies and aired on the same network from April 1, 2004, to September 23, 2004, on Thursdays at 25:30. ADV Films licensed Gensomaden Saiyuki and the movie. The sequels Saiyuki Reload and Saiyuki Reload Gunlock are licensed by Geneon in North America, and consist of 25 and 26 episodes respectively.

In February 2006, Geneon and Tokyopop have agreed to cross promote several properties for which Tokyopop is releasing the manga and Geneon the anime. For Saiyuki Gunlock, the two companies will promote each other's products with advertisements. Geneon will advertise Tokyopop's manga on their DVDs, and Tokyopop will advertise Geneon's DVDs in the manga.

Saiyuki Reload is faithful to the manga from the fourteenth episode and onward, having deviated from it for the first 13 episodes. Saiyuki Reload Gunlock also starts off deviated from the manga, until midway into the series, but strays from it during its finale. A new OVA has been released by Studio Pierrot, which covers the "Burial" arc of the Saiyuki Reload manga; it is called Saiyuki Reload: Burial.

In 2011, a new original video animation (OVA) series, Saiyuki Gaiden was created based on the same name manga series written and illustrated by Kazuya Minekura, and it is a prequel to the manga series saiyuki which ended in Ichijinsha's Monthly Comic Zero-Sum magazine in 2009.

An anime television series adaptation of the Saiyuki Reload Blast manga series aired from July 5 to September 20, 2017, on Tokyo MX, TV Aichi, BS11, Sun TV. It ran for 12 episodes. Crunchyroll has licensed the series, and Funimation released it on home video as part of the two companies' partnership. Muse Communication licensed the series in South and Southeast Asia; they aired it on Animax Asia and later released on their YouTube channel.

A new anime series produced by Liden Films titled Saiyuki Reload: Zeroin has been announced. It is directed by Misato Takada, with Michiko Yokote and Aya Matsui writing the series' scripts, Noriko Ogura designing the characters and serving as chief animation director, and Yūsuke Shirato composing the music. The main cast members reprised their roles. It aired from January 6 to March 31, 2022, on AT-X and other networks. Granrodeo performed the opening theme "Kamino Hotokemo," while Shugo Nakamura performed the ending theme "Ruten." Sentai Filmworks licensed the series outside of Asia. In South and Southeast Asia, Muse Communication licensed the anime.

HIDIVE Streams Saiyuki Reload -ZEROIN- Anime's English Dub, Dub premieres on February 24 in the United States, Canada, the United Kingdom, Ireland, Australia, New Zealand, South Africa, Latin America, Spain, Portugal, Turkey, Scandinavian countries, and the Netherlands.  The show premiered on January 6 on AT-X, Tokyo MX, and BS11. Sentai Filmworks licensed the anime, and HIDIVE is streaming the series as it airs in Japan. The four main cast members of the previous Saiyuki, Saiyuki Reload, Saiyuki Gunlock, and Saiyuki Reload Blast television anime are reprising their roles.

Saiyuki Reload Sanzo's Song Collection Released on October 24, 2007, published and distribute by Frontier Works.

Saiyuki complete vocal song collection distribute on August 27, 2014, by Frontier Works.

Blu-ray box

Saiyuki complete collection (Blu-ray) (contains episodes 1-50 of the original anime series directed by Hayato Date all in standard definition on 3 blu-ray discs) Release in march, 26 2019.

On November 30, 2021 Discotek Media distribute Saiyuki Reload Blu-ray contains episodes 1-25 of the anime directed by Tetsuya Endo in standard definition on a blu-ray disc. This complete collection also included is the original Japanese language, English subtitles and the English dub. On September 27, 2022, Also Discotek Media Distribute Saiyuki Reload Gunlock contains episodes 1-26 of the anime directed by Tetsuya Endo in standard definition a Blu-ray disc.

A Blu-ray of all three volumes of "Saiyuki Reload: Burial (OAV) " based on Kazuya Minekura "Saiyuki Reload" has been released on December 21, 2018.

On September 28, 2018 Frontier Works Released All 4 volumes of OVA "Saiyuki Gaiden" Blu-ray BOX by completely new HD digital remastering.

On July 24, 2018 FUNimation Entertainment released Saiyuki Reload Blast (BD+DVD) contains episodes 1-12 of the anime directed by Hideaki Nakano, Also FUNimation Entertainment distribute Saiyuki Reload Blast [Essentials] (Blu-ray-A) on January 28, 2020.

"Saiyuki RELOAD -ZEROIN-" Blu-ray BOX Volume 1 (BD) Released on April 27, 2022
"Saiyuki RELOAD -ZEROIN-" Blu-ray BOX Volume 2 Released on June 29, 2022, Meanwhile, campaign to commemorate the release of Volumes 1 and 2 of the Blu-ray BOX "Saiyuki RELOAD -ZEROIN-" was held at Animate nationwide!.

Live-action musicals

The musical adaptation of Kazuya Minekura’s Saiyuki started its history with its first show “-Go to the West-” It was performed at the Tennozu Galaxy Theater in Tokyo from September 13th to 21st, 2008, and has been loved by the fans of the series for more than ten years. DVD of "Saiyuki Kagekiden -Go to the West-" Released on January 25, 2009.

The story takes place 3 years before Journey of sanzo and his group to the West and Rikudo arc. Since "Saiyuki Kagekiden: Go to the West" in 2008, the musical "Saiyuki Kagekiden" has been performed in nine works.

"Saiyuki Kageki-den: Dead or Alive" musical ran in 2009.

Saiyuki Kagekiden "Go to the West" & "Dead or Alive, has the same cast and a man in drag playing the role of Kanzeon Bosatsu.

A DVD reprint for the 2009 stage plays Go to the West and Dead or Alive as a limited-edition set was announced for 10 May 2017 in conjunction with the 20th-Anniversary of the manga series.

In 2014 the third musical of "Saiyuki Kagekiden" will be performed for the first time in about five years since the previous work title Saiyuki Kagekiden: God Child, performance begun on May 2 to 7, 2014, The story is set on Saiyuki: Kinkaku Ginkaku Hen and Saiyuki's Kami-sama arc from "Saiyuki" Volumes 6 to 9.

In 2015 Saiyuki Kagekiden: Burial musical show will run from September 17 to 23, 2015, the story takes place in the Burial Arc. In September 2015 Saiyuki Kagekiden: Reload' musical show will run from 17 to 23.

On July 20, 2015, On the event of Saiyuki Kagekiden, Cast members Included Hiroki Suzuki and others sing the theme song  of singing "Go to the West" from "Saiyuki Kagekiden: Burial" passionately in the background of the DVD video based on Kazuya Minekura's "Saiyuki".

"Saiyuki Kagekiden the Movie: Bullets" starring Hiroki Suzuki and others screened at "Saiyuki FESTA 2017" being held at Makuhari Messe in Chiba from January 7 to today 8th, released on DVD and CD on June 28, 2017. The film is based on an original short story featuring the cast of "Saiyuki Kagekiden", Produced to commemorate the 20th anniversary of Kazuya Minekura 's manga "Saiyuki".

In January 2017, A memorial talk by the cast of Sanzo and his group at "Saiyuki FESTA" Was held.

The 2014/2015 stage cast were also involved in a compilation of 8 original short stories shot for a film release, shown across three screenings (two of which included cast appearances) at the SaiyukiFESTA 2017 event at the Makuhari Messe International Convention Centre on 8 January, commemorating 20 years of publication for the manga.

A behind-the-scenes promotional documentary Saiyuki Kagekiden: Over the Bullets for the movie/event featuring cast insights on their journeys with the show was broadcast on Tokyo MX1 and online via mcas on Christmas Day 2016.

"Saiyuki Kagekiden: Ibun" Stage Play Reveals Cast in Costume, Play runs in Tokyo in September 2018

On January 3, 2019 Saiyuki Manga Gets 2 New Stage Musicals based on Kazuya Minekura's Saiyuki manga, musicals titled "Saiyuki Kagekiden: Darkness" and Following its eighth show "Saiyuki Kagekiden: Oasis". "Saiyuki Kagekiden: Darkness" will run at the Hulic Hall in Tokyo from June 6 to 14, 2019, while Saiyuki Kagekiden: Oasis will run in February 2 to 9, 2020. Kaori Miura is Scripting and directing both musicals.

The story for "Saiyuki Kagekiden: Darkness" will center on the Sanzō party encountering a foreign priest named Hazel who can resurrect the dead. The priest is accompanied by his follower Gato.

The story for "Saiyuki Kagekiden: Sunrise" begins with the party being attacked, and Son Gokū suddenly contracting a deadly illness. Genzo Sanzō goes to Hazel in an effort to track down who is responsible. Meanwhile, Son Gokū, Sha Gojō, and Cho Hakkai stay in a peaceful yōkai village, but are soon dragged into a conflict centering on the waters of an oasis that will pit yōkai and human against one another.

In February 2021 its latest ninth show "Saiyuki Kagekiden: Sunrise", which follows "Darkness" and "Oasis", which will be the final chapter of the Hazel Arc,  to be performed from February 11 to 14, 2021 at COOL JAPAN PARK OSAKA WW Hall in Osaka, and from February 18 to 24 at Shinagawa Prince Hotell Stellar Ballo.

Saiyuki Kagekiden Returns with New Musical Stage Show in 2023 title "Saiyuki Kagekiden: Gaiden".

Reception

Sales and popularity
The Saiyuki franchise has become a mainstay of manga/anime culture, and its various entries have continually garnered critical praise and accolades. Gensomaden Saiyuki won the Animage Anime Grand Prix Award in 2000, also Genjo Sanzo won the best Male Character. On January 17, 2001, "Gensomaden Saiyuki" It was ranked 4th on Animage magazine list of top 100 most important anime ever published. On August 13, 2001, issue of Newtype Magazine lists their top 10 Anime titles and the first anime of Saiyuki "Gensomaden Saiyuki" It was ranked 9th as well Genjo Sanzo as top ten male characters It was ranked 6th. On May 10, 2002, The brand new June issue of Animage Magazine includes a list of the top 20 anime programs of 2001, as chosen by Animage readers and "Gensomaden Saiyuki" It was ranked 4th. During the third quarter from 2003, Saiyuki ranked at the top of ICv2's Top 50 Manga Properties. On March 30, 2004, Saiyuki was the top 10 of Shōjo manga Series on ICv2 site. On October 8, 2004, It was reported Research has shown that in recent years Saiyuki anime has become extremely popular among Japan's young women fans. Saiyuki manga was top Manga Publisher of the Year in "ICV2 2004 manga awards", came in a very close second for 2004 Award. On January 16, 2005, Saiyuki Vol. 6 ranked at the top of ICv2's top 10 selling-manga. and Saiyuki Vol. 8 was also ranked 8th of top 10 selling-manga of Tokyopop on June 13, 2005. During its premiere as a television series the Saiyuki manga sold more than 3,200,000 as of Volume 6 estimation by ComiPress. In 2004, on 26th Anime Grand Prix Award, Saiyuki Reload was the top ten Anime titles It was ranked 4th, Meanwhile, Genjo Sanzo was the top of ten best Male Character It was ranked 7th. In 2005, on 27th Anime Grand Prix Award, Saiyuki Reload Gunlock was the top twenty Anime titles It was ranked 17th. Saiyuki Gaiden and Saiyuki Reload continued to be at the top 10 weekly Japanese ranking chart whenever a manga volume debuted. Saiyuki Gaiden manga volumes were frequently ranked in the top manga like the Saiyuki Reload manga. In 2006 Saiyuki Reload was listed by PUFF (also known as Manga Oscars) known by many fans as one of the definite study guides for those who appreciate manga, as 10th in Long Stories categories. 
  
As of January 2021, The manga franchise as a whole has 25 million copies in circulation worldwide.

Critical response
The manga has received critical praise and accolades criticism from various publications. Manga News described; "Saiyuki may be a quest, at its core, but it acts more as a motor for humor and development. atypical charisms. Against the backdrop of a mythological story, not very innovative, the mangaka indeed plays a lot on flashbacks, which give depth to the characters while bringing the essential dramatic side, and the experience accumulated by our heroes. These learn from their mistakes and overcome their weaknesses. Anime UK News described Saiyuki as "there’s no denying the raw energy and compelling storytelling it delivers. The glimpses it affords of tragic backstories for each of the protagonists draw the reader in, eager to learn more about what lies beneath their self-confident, worldly-wise swaggering; bad boys, traditionally, have had to develop tough exteriors to conceal their raw inner wounds. The excellent translation from the original Tokyopop edition (2002) by Alethea Nibley and Athena Nibley captures just the right tone of voice for the members of the Sanzo party, constantly arguing and joshing each other".

References

External links
Official Studio Pierrot Gensomaden Saiyuki website 
Official Studio Pierrot Gensomaden Saiyuki: Requiem For the One Not Chosen website 
Official Studio Pierrot Saiyuki Reload website 
Saiyuki Reload Gunlock website 
Official TV Tokyo Gensomaden Saiyuki website 

Official/ "Saiyuki" CD official website 
"World is Mine -mine- website 
 "Saiyuki RELOAD BLAST website 
 "Saiyuki Reload: Zeroin website 
 OVA "Saiyuki Gaiden" official website 
 "Minekura.net website 

1997 manga
1999 anime OVAs
2000 anime television series debuts
2001 anime films
2002 anime OVAs
2003 anime television series debuts
2004 anime television series debuts
2007 anime OVAs
2011 anime OVAs
2017 anime television series debuts
2022 anime television series debuts
ADV Films
Adventure anime and manga
Arms Corporation
Buddhism in fiction
Chinese mythology in anime and manga
Comics set in India
Crunchyroll anime
Discotek Media
Fantasy anime and manga
Gangan Comics manga
Geneon USA
Ichijinsha manga
Josei manga
Liden Films
Pierrot (company)
Platinum Vision
 
Sentai Filmworks
Shenmo fiction
Shōnen manga
TV Tokyo original programming
Tokyopop titles